The 1959–60 season was the 61st season of competitive league football in the history of English football club Wolverhampton Wanderers. They played in the First Division, then the highest level of English football.

The club were narrowly denied a third consecutive league title after Burnley finished one point ahead of them. They did however win both the FA Cup (for a fourth and final time) as well as the FA Charity Shield and also reach the quarter-final stage of the European Cup.

Results

Football League First Division
Final table

Pld = Matches played; W = Matches won; D = Matches drawn; L = Matches lost; F = Goals for; A = Goals against; GA = Goal average; Pts = Points

First Division

FA Cup

FA Charity Shield

European Cup

Players Used

Top scorer

Most appearances

1959-60
Wolverhampton Wanderers F.C.